= Porfiados =

Uruguayan punk rock band

- Origin: Montevideo, Uruguay
- Genres: Punk rock
- Years active: 1997–present
- Label: Independent
- Members: Leonardo Sereno; Nicolás Noroña; Diego Palleiro; Pablo Tice
- Past members: Sebastián Tentti; Mauricio Blanco
- Website: http://www.porfiados.com.uy/

Porfiados (formerly known as Cría Cuervos) is a Uruguayan punk rock band from Montevideo, Uruguay, formed in 1997. Their actual line-up is vocalist and guitarist Leonardo Sereno, guitarist Nicolás Noroña, bassist Diego Palleiro and drummer Pablo Tice.

== History ==
In 1997, drummer Pablo Tice met bassist Antunez and started the band under the name Cría Cuervos. Vocalist Mauricio Blanco and guitarist Sebastián Tentti joined afterwards rounding up the original line-up. Their first gig happened on October 24, 1997, in El Cielo, a well renowned pub in the underground scene.

In 1998 Leonardo Sereno joined the band as vocalist and singer after Mauricio and Sebastián left the band due to personal issues. The trio continued playing live and recorded their debut album Simple which was released in 1999.

After many shows they decided it was time to release their second studio album and in 2002 they recorded Ahora ó Nunca, featuring a more evolved punk pop sound. This was one of the first Uruguayan albums to be available online for free. During the next two years they kept performing and in 2004 they took part in Pepsi Bandplugged contest.

In 2007 the band released Vendedor de Ilusiones their third album consolidating the band's actual sound. This record was also available for free in their website. It was also the first album to have radio airplay winning the Estamos Rodeados radio contest.

Two years later, in 2009, the band recorded the single Maldito Verano which was featured as the presentation of the homonym radio show. Shortly afterwards Antunez left the band, Diego Palleiro started playing the bass in his place and Nicolás Noroña joined the band to play the guitar completing their actual line-up.

In 2010 they released Porfiados a self-titled album containing 15 songs, including a remastered version of the single Maldito Verano. During two years they played a handful of shows including some festivals. In 2014 they released A Cielo Abierto a single in opposition of the proposed open-pit mine Aratiri and the song was featured in many marches against this mine.

In summer 2016, the band returned to the studio and recorded Episodio 1: Seres Extraños the first of three concept albums, featuring 7 tracks and artwork by comic artist Pablo Praino. Shortly after that, the band went on a hiatus, releasing only one live album called Volvemos si nos dejan.... On 2023 they released a studio album titled Episodio 2: Revolución.

== Current lineup ==
- Leonardo Sereno: Lead Vocals, Rhythm Guitar
- Nicolás Noroña: Lead Guitar
- Diego Palleiro: Bass
- Pablo Tice: drums, backing vocals

== Discography ==
=== Studio albums ===
- Simple (Indie, 1999)
- Ahora o Nunca (Indie, 2003)
- Vendedor de Ilusiones (Indie, 2005)
- Porfiados (Indie, 2010)
- Episodio 1: Seres Extraños (Indie, 2016)
- Episodio 2: Revolución (Indie, 2023)

=== EP'S ===
- Maldito Verano (Indie, 2009)
- A Cielo Abierto (Indie, 2013)

=== Live Albums ===
- Volvemos, si nos dejan... (Indie, 2019)

=== Compilations ===
- 13 (Trece, 2008)
